John Collinson may refer to:

John Collinson (cricketer) (1911–1979), English cricketer
John Collinson (historian) (died 1793), historian of Somerset